The 2021 Monaco Formula 2 round was a couple of motor races for Formula 2 cars that took place on 21–22 May 2021 at the Circuit de Monaco in Monte Carlo, Monaco as part of the FIA Formula 2 Championship. It was the second round of the 2021 FIA Formula 2 Championship and ran in support of the 2021 Monaco Grand Prix.

As he won the Feature Race at the principality, Théo Pourchaire thus became the youngest race winner in Formula 2 history aged 17 years and 264 days, beating the previous record of Lando Norris.

Background

Driver changes
Jack Aitken returned to Formula 2 as a replacement for Matteo Nannini for HWA Racelab, who decided to fully concentrate on his campaign in Formula 3 due to sponsorship issues.

Classification

Qualifying

Group A

Group B

Notes
 – Alessio Deledda was not able to set a time within 107%, but was later given permission to start both Sprint Race 1 and the Feature Race from the back of the grid.

Sprint race 1

Sprint race 2 

Notes
 – Marcus Armstrong was supposed to start Sprint Race 2 from P1, but failed to rejoin the starting grid due to a technical issue. Thus, he had to start the race from the pit lane.
 – Liam Lawson finished the race in first place but was disqualified for using the wrong throttle map at the start, a breach of Technical Regulations 3.6.5.

Feature race 

Notes
 – Both Jüri Vips and Gianluca Petecof were given a five-second time penalty and a ten-second time penalty for causing a collision respectively.
 - Christian Lundgaard was given a five-second time penalty for speeding in the pit lane.

Standings after the event

Drivers' Championship standings

Teams' Championship standings

 Note: Only the top five positions are included for both sets of standings.

See also 
2021 Monaco Grand Prix

References

External links 
 

Monaco
Formula 2
Formula 2